The Mountainair Municipal Auditorium, in Mountainair, New Mexico, was built in 1934.  It was listed on the National Register of Historic Places in 1987.

It has also been known as the Mountainair Community Building and as the Community Center.

It is the most prominent building in Mountainair, and was used as a political symbol of New Deal programs by New Mexico Governor Clyde Tingly.

References

National Register of Historic Places in Torrance County, New Mexico
Moderne architecture in the United States
Buildings and structures completed in 1934
1934 establishments in New Mexico